Gabrielona sulcifera is a species of sea snail, a marine gastropod mollusk in the family Phasianellidae.

Description
The size of the shell varies between 1.3 mm and 3 mm.

Distribution
This species occurs in the Caribbean Sea, the Gulf of Mexico and the Lesser Antilles; in the Atlantic Ocean off Brazil.

References

 Robertson, R. 1973. The genus Gabrielona (Phasianellidae) in the Indo-Pacific and West Indies. Indo-Pacific Mollusca 3(14): 41–61
  Rosenberg, G., F. Moretzsohn, and E. F. García. 2009. Gastropoda (Mollusca) of the Gulf of Mexico, Pp. 579–699 in Felder, D.L. and D.K. Camp (eds.), Gulf of Mexico–Origins, Waters, and Biota. Biodiversity. Texas A&M Press, College Station, Texas

External links
 

Phasianellidae
Gastropods described in 1973